The Poetic Books, also called the Sapiential Books, are a division of the Christian Bible grouping 5 or 7 books (depending on the canon) in the Old Testament. The term "Sapiential Books" refers to the same set, although not all the Psalms are usually regarded as belonging to the Wisdom tradition.

In terms of the Tanakh, it includes the three poetic books of Ketuvim, as well as Ecclesiastes and the Song of Songs from the Five Megillot. Wisdom and Sirach are also part of the Poetic Books, but aren't part of the Hebrew Bible, and are seen by Christians as deuterocanonical, for which reason they are excluded from Protestant Bibles.

List
The Poetic Books are:

 Job
 Psalms
 Proverbs
 Ecclesiastes
 Song of Songs
 Wisdom (included only in Catholic and Orthodox canons)
 Sirach (included only in Catholic and Orthodox canons)

See also
 Biblical canon
 Other major divisions of the Old Testament:
 Pentateuch
 Historical books
 Prophetic books

References

 
Ancient Hebrew texts
Biblical criticism
Christian terminology
Development of the Christian biblical canon
Old Testament